Pallava dynasty was a Tamil kingdom ruling most of South India between the 3rd and the 9th centuries.

Pallava may also refer to:
Pallava script
Pallava coinage
Panch pallava, a ritual assortment of five different leaves used as a totem by the Maratha culture in India

See also
 Palava (disambiguation)
 Palaver (disambiguation)
 Polava, a river of Saxony, Germany and of the Czech Republic